Austral was a passenger ship built by John Elder & Co., Govan and launched on 21 December 1881 for the Orient Steam Navigation Company, Glasgow. She was used in the passenger route trade to Australia.

She sank at her mooring in Neutral Bay, off Kirribilli Point in Sydney Harbour on 11 November 1882. Five crew were killed in the incident. The ship was refloated on 1 March 1883. She subsequently sailed to Glasgow for refit.

She was chartered to Anchor Line for 7 months during 1884 for the Liverpool to New York passenger route arriving back at Neutral Bay in 1885.

Fate
Austral arrived for breaking up at Genoa on 27 May 1903.

References

External links
 
 
 

1881 ships
Ships built on the River Clyde
Maritime incidents in November 1882